Food storage containers are widespread in use throughout the world and have probably been in use since the first human civilizations.

Early civilizations
In early civilizations cereal grains such as maize, wheat, barley etc. were stored in large airy buildings, often raised up from the ground to reduce infestation by pests and vermin. Ancient Egyptian  and early Hebrew writings  include reference to such buildings and their successors can still be seen in use in less developed countries and regions.

Smaller quantities of food were stored in baskets made from woven grasses or leaves and such designs have remained in use to the present day.

In more recent times but prior to the invention of the refrigerator many food products were stored in the home as preserves or pickles, often in heat sealed jars such as Kilner jars

Modern containers
In the modern developed world, a very wide range of food packaging and containers is now available made from many materials.

Plastic containers
Many products use low-density polyethylene formed into plastic bags  or plastic boxes. There are many makers of plastic boxes some such as Tupperware and Lock & Lock are known throughout much of the developed world.

Metal containers
Longer term storage or storage of items needing a higher degree of protection from the elements may use sheet metal. A common form of such storage is the biscuit tin. See Canning.

Refrigerator
Perhaps the most ubiquitous domestic item of food storage is the fridge or fridge-freezer in which a wide variety of foodstuffs are contained and preserved through the use of low temperatures.

Disposable

Disposable food containers, a form of disposable food packaging, may be used for food or beverages. Disposable containers are often made of paper or paperboard, plastic (including plastic foam), or aluminum.

Industrial food storage containers
Wherever food is harvested, manufactured or distributed there is a need for containers to enable the food to travel securely and in good condition to the shop, warehouse or distribution depot. For many foods, especially those in their own individual containers such as canned vegetables, the common container is the corrugated fiberboard box, Corrugated boxes  are available in many sizes.

A variety of Bulk boxes are also used.

See also 
Food storage
Reusable packaging
Gastronorm, a European standard for food container sizes, both for cooking and storage
Shaker-style pantry box

References

Robertson, G. L. (2013). "Food Packaging: Principles & Practice". CRC Press. 
Soroka, W, "Fundamentals of Packaging Technology", IoPP, 2002, 
Yam, K.L., "Encyclopedia of Packaging Technology", John Wiley & Sons, 2009,

External links